Svistunovo is a rural locality (a village) in Gryazovetskoye Rural Settlement, Gryazovetsky District, Vologda Oblast, Russia. The population was 34 as of 2002.

Geography 
Svistunovo is located 3 km south of Gryazovets (the district's administrative centre) by road. Krestovka is the nearest rural locality.

References 

Rural localities in Gryazovetsky District